Lake Davis is a census-designated place (CDP) in Plumas County, California, United States. The population was 45 at the 2010 census.

Geography
Lake Davis is located at  (39.868841, -120.472214).

Demographics

2010
At the 2010 census Lake Davis had a population of 45. The population density was 8.4 people per square mile (3.2/km). The racial makeup of Lake Davis was 45 (100.0%) White, 0 (0.0%) African American, 0 (0.0%) Native American, 0 (0.0%) Asian, 0 (0.0%) Pacific Islander, 0 (0.0%) from other races, and 0 (0.0%) from two or more races.  Hispanic or Latino of any race were 2 people (4.4%).

The whole population lived in households, no one lived in non-institutionalized group quarters and no one was institutionalized.

There were 23 households, 2 (8.7%) had children under the age of 18 living in them, 17 (73.9%) were opposite-sex married couples living together, 0 (0%) had a female householder with no husband present, 0 (0%) had a male householder with no wife present.  There were 1 (4.3%) unmarried opposite-sex partnerships, and 0 (0%) same-sex married couples or partnerships. 5 households (21.7%) were one person and 3 (13.0%) had someone living alone who was 65 or older. The average household size was 1.96.  There were 17 families (73.9% of households); the average family size was 2.24.

The age distribution was 4 people (8.9%) under the age of 18, 0 people (0%) aged 18 to 24, 5 people (11.1%) aged 25 to 44, 24 people (53.3%) aged 45 to 64, and 12 people (26.7%) who were 65 or older.  The median age was 60.5 years. For every 100 females, there were 104.5 males.  For every 100 females age 18 and over, there were 115.8 males.

There were 155 housing units at an average density of 28.8 per square mile, of the occupied units 23 (100%) were owner-occupied and 0 (0%) were rented. The homeowner vacancy rate was 0%; the rental vacancy rate was 0%.  45 people (100% of the population) lived in owner-occupied housing units and 0 people (0%) lived in rental housing units.

2000
At the 2000 census there were 23 people, 10 households, and 9 families in the CDP. The population density was 3.7 people per square mile (1.4/km). There were 99 housing units at an average density of 16.1 per square mile (6.2/km).  The racial makeup of the CDP was 95.65% White and 4.35% African American. Hispanic or Latino of any race were 8.70%.

Of the 10 households none had children under the age of 18 living with them, 80.0% were married couples living together, and 10.0% were non-families. No households were one person and none had someone living alone who was 65 or older. The average household size was 2.30 and the average family size was 2.33.

The age distribution was 30.4% from 25 to 44, 39.1% from 45 to 64, and 30.4% 65 or older. The median age was 60 years. For every 100 females, there were 155.6 males. For every 100 females age 18 and over, there were 155.6 males.

Grizzly Valley Dam
The census-designated place is just downstream from the Grizzly Valley Dam, which impounds Lake Davis.

Politics

References

External links
 Plumas National Forest: Lake Davis Recreation Area
 Lake Davis - Northern Pike Eradication Project 

Census-designated places in Plumas County, California
Census-designated places in California